Master Mind is a 2015 Indian Kannada-language film written and directed by Kumar Govind. The film stars Rajvardhan.

Cast 
Rajvardhan as Raj 
Kumar Govind as Mahesh
Divya Gowda as Madhu 
Bhakthi as Anu 
Thamanna Pasha as Seema

Release

GS Kumar of The Times of India  gave the film a rating of 3/5 and wrote "Rajavardhan is impressive as the formidable Raj. Tamanna Pasha’s brilliant portrayal of the taxi driver makes her stand out. Divya Gowda and Kumar Govind play their parts with ease. Music by M Fazil is average". Shyam Prasad S of Bangalore Mirror  gave the film a rating of 1/5 and wrote "Apart from Raj Vardhan’s unappetising performance, Tamanna’s Kannada, which gives Pooja Gandhi a run for her money, has to be endured. Only ‘Bullet ‘Prakash manages to act in the entire film". Sify.com wrote "M Fazil seems to have scored the film for the heck of it, nothing special about it. Unfortunately there is not even a single element that can draw audience to theatres! The movie is a total waste of time and can be avoided even if it is played on TV, in near future!" SV from  Deccan Herald wrote "Suffice to say Master Mind may not be masterly but much, much better than the weekly tripe dished out at theatres". A Sharadhaa from  The New Indian Express wrote "Master Mind fails on several counts and mostly it fails the audience and their faith in the actor-director who had the courage to introduce a new face — Raj Vardhan — in an otherwise big-budget film. This turned to be a poor choice as the actor cannot act, run, dance, deliver dialogues and  nor does he have the ability to emote. The film’s tagline - "The Game of Death", is ominous as it alludes to its own death knell at the box office".

References 

2010s Kannada-language films
2015 films